Birkin is a village in North Yorkshire, England.

Birkin may also refer to:
 Birkin bag, a handbag
 Birkin (surname), people with the surname Birkin
 Birkin family (Russian nobility)
 Bentley Birkin car
 Birkin Cars, a South African car manufacturer of Lotus Super 7 replicas